Khammam Lok Sabha constituency is one of the 17 Lok Sabha (Lower House of the Parliament) constituencies in Telangana state in southern India.

Nama Nageswara Rao of Telangana Rashtra Samithi is currently representing the constituency for second time.

Overview
Since its inception in 1952 Khammam seat is Congress strong hold where it has won 12 times various other political outfits like Communist Party of India,  Telugu Desam Party, Communist Party of India (Marxist) and YSR Congress Party  have won it during different general elections.

Assembly segments
Khammam presently comprises the following Legislative Assembly segments:

Members of Parliament

Election results

General Election, 2019

General Election, 2014

General Election, 2009

General Election, 2004

General Election, 1999

General Election, 1998

General Election, 1996

General Election, 1991

General Election, 1962
 T. Lakshikantamma (Congress) : 163,806 votes
 T B Vittal Rao (CPI) : 1,51,7460

Trivia
 Jalagam Vengala Rao, former Chief Minister of Andhra Pradesh represented the constituency in Eighth and Ninth Lok Sabha respectively.
Nadendla Bhaskara Rao, former Chief Minister of Andhra Pradesh represented the constituency in Twelfth Lok Sabha.

See also
 Khammam district
 List of Constituencies of the Lok Sabha

References

External links
 Khammam lok sabha  constituency election 2019 date and schedule

Lok Sabha constituencies in Telangana
Khammam district